Eurydera is a genus of beetles in the family Carabidae, containing the following species:

 Eurydera acutispina (Fairmaire, 1868) 
 Eurydera alluaudi Jeannel, 1949  
 Eurydera ambreana Mateu, 1973 
 Eurydera armata Laporte De Castelnau, 1831 
 Eurydera bimaculata Jeannel, 1949 
 Eurydera catalai Jeannel, 1949  
 Eurydera crispatifrons (Fairmaire, 1896) 
 Eurydera cuspidata (Klug, 1835) 
 Eurydera ebenina Mateu, 1973 
 Eurydera femorata (Klug, 1833) 
 Eurydera fossulata Mateu, 1973 
 Eurydera foveicollis Jeannel, 1949 
 Eurydera heimi Jeannel, 1949 
 Eurydera inermis Laporte De Castelnau, 1835 
 Eurydera jeanneli Mateu, 1973 
 Eurydera latipennis (Klug, 1835) 
 Eurydera longispina Jeannel, 1949 
 Eurydera lugubrina Fairmaire, 1899 
 Eurydera madecassa Mateu, 1973 
 Eurydera mormolycoides (Chevrolat, 1851) 
 Eurydera ocularis (Fairmaire, 1868) 
 Eurydera olsoufieffi Jeannel, 1949 
 Eurydera ornatipennis (Fairmaire, 1897) 
 Eurydera peyrierasi Mateu, 1973 
 Eurydera rufotincta (Fairmaire, 1868) 
 Eurydera rugiceps Jeannel, 1949 
 Eurydera sicardi Jeannel, 1949  
 Eurydera sublaevis Laporte De Castelnau, 1835 
 Eurydera sulcicollis Mateu, 1973 
 Eurydera suturalis Jeannel, 1949 
 Eurydera unicolor (Klug, 1833)

References

Lebiinae